Zagymnus rugicollis is a species of longhorn beetle in the Cerambycinae subfamily. It was described by Chemsak and Linsley in 1968. It is known from Belize.

References

Agallissini
Beetles described in 1968